Shondaland (stylized as ShondaLand from 2005 to 2016 and shondaland thereafter) is an American television production company founded by television writer and producer Shonda Rhimes. She founded it to be one of the production companies of her first series Grey's Anatomy in 2005. It has since gone on to produce Rhimes's other creations, Grey's spinoff Private Practice and the widely popular political drama Scandal, and her other productions—the short-lived Off the Map, the Viola Davis-starring legal thriller How to Get Away with Murder, and the crime thriller The Catch—all of which are co-produced with ABC Studios and air on ABC. As of 2017, it has a partnership affiliation with Netflix, and before that Disney-ABC.

History

Programming block
In 2014, the ABC network programmed its entire Thursday primetime lineup with television series produced by Shondaland, then branded the Shondaland-filled programming block as "Thank God It's Thursday," also referred to in its shortened form, TGIT. This echoes ABC's former TGIF branding of its Friday night family sitcoms and NBC's Must See TV promotion of formidable Thursday night television hits in the 1990s. Thursday is an especially important night for American television networks because it is the last chance for advertisers of weekend purchases, like movies and cars, to reach a large TV audience, and networks schedule highly rated programming for the night to attract those advertising dollars. The Associated Press called Rhimes' reign of an entire night of network television "unmatched in TV history."

Productions
The first series produced by Shondaland is Grey's Anatomy, which premiered on March 27, 2005, and currently is broadcasting its eighteenth season. In 2007, Private Practice premiered, and lasted for six seasons, until its final broadcast, on January 22, 2013. The third installment, Off the Map, was created by Jenna Bans and lasted for only one season, in 2011. Scandal and How to Get Away with Murder, premiered in 2012 and 2014, respectively, with Scandal airing its final episode on April 19, 2018 and How to Get Away with Murder airing its final episode on May 14, 2020. The comedy-driven crime drama The Catch aired for two seasons and received generally positive reviews from critics. The period drama Still Star-Crossed premiered on May 29, 2017, and was cancelled after one season.
The legal drama For the People, created by Paul William Davies and set to premiere in the 2017–18 television season, is the eighth television series produced by Shondaland. In May 2019, it was cancelled after two seasons.
It was announced on January 3, 2018 that Scandal and How to Get Away With Murder would crossover with one another in Shondaland's first crossover event (excluding spin-offs).

Website
In 2017, Shondaland launched the lifestyle website Shondaland.com in partnership with Hearst.

Initiatives 
Shonda Rhimes shares her knowledge with aspiring screenwriters and producers through ShondaLand and initiatives for her MasterClass.com program.

Shondaland partnered with Seriesfest in 2019 to launch the Women's Directing Mentorship, a competition designed to discover aspiring female directors.  The Seriesfest panel included Shondaland's Head of Fiction Alison Eakle, Akua Murphy, Katie Lowes and Anna Deavere Smith. The first Shondaland Women's Directing Mentorship was awarded to Rachel Myers.

In January 2020, it was announced that Shonda Rhimes had partnered with iHeartMedia to launch Shondaland Audio.

Shondaland overview

Recurring actors
Some actors appear in more than one television show produced by Shondaland. Currently, Liza Weil, Mimi Kennedy, John Getz,  José Zúñiga, Cynthia Stevenson and Anthony Hill are the only actors to make appearances in four shows.
  = Main role   = Recurring role

References

External links

 Shondaland.com

Television production companies of the United States
American companies established in 2005
Mass media companies established in 2005
2005 establishments in California
Companies based in Los Angeles
Entertainment companies based in California
Privately held companies based in California